The Vice is an advanced squeeze in contract bridge. Its distinguishing motive is presence of a "vice" menace in one suit, where one defender holds cards of equivalent rank which split the declarer's pair of cards in front of him, where his partner has a winner in the suit. It was first attested by Terence Reese in the book "The Expert Game", a.k.a. "Master Play in Contract Bridge". In other words, the defenders have a "high" finesse position, equivalent to the one in diagram:
If West can be forced to abandon QJ, the defenders will take only one trick in the suit.

A similar motive is encountered in guard squeezes, however, in the vice, the defenders have a winner in the suit. Since that winner will take a trick, this squeeze is without .

Examples
 Hearts are the "vice suit", and the second menace is the declarer's 8. This is a position akin to automatic simple squeeze. When South leads the high 5, West must not discard the 10; when he parts with a heart honor, declarer leads the heart and East must cede the last trick to dummy's heart ten.
 When the second menace (diamonds) is in dummy, it must be a two-card menace accompanied by an entry, otherwise West can safely abandon the suit; if the K were absent, the West can discard the diamond winner, as the declarer will not have the entry to enjoy it.

References
 Terence Reese, The Expert Game (American title: Master Play in Contract Bridge)

Contract bridge squeezes